A Dorset knob is a kind of hard, dry, savoury biscuit from Dorset which is very crumbly and has the consistency of very dry stale bread or rusks.

Description 
Dorset knobs are made from bread dough enriched with extra sugar and butter. They are rolled and shaped by hand, and baked three times.

They are named after their shape's resemblance to Dorset knob buttons, but have also been compared, in size, to door knobs.

Dorset knobs are typically eaten with cheese (for example, Dorset Blue Vinney). Dorset knobs were said by his parlour maid to have been a favourite food of local author Thomas Hardy. As they are so hard, they are also eaten by first soaking them in sweet tea.

History 
In the past there were a number of producers of Dorset knobs. Today the only firm to produce them commercially is Moores Biscuits, which used to be sited in Morcombelake, four miles west of Bridport in the west of the county of Dorset in England, but has now moved into Bridport itself. The Moores family have baked biscuits in Dorset since before 1860. The bakery was established in 1880 by Samuel Moores and manufactures a variety of traditional biscuits in addition to the Dorset knob. Dorset knobs are only produced during the months of January and February. They are normally sold in a distinctive and traditional tin.

Dorset knob throwing 

The practice of Dorset knob throwing began in 2008 at a festival in the Dorset village of Cattistock, inspired by a Yorkshire pudding throwing game that the organiser had seen on television.

The competition is now held every year on the first Sunday in May. Other events at the festival included a knob and spoon race, knob darts, knob painting and guess the weight of the knob. In 2017, the Dorset knob-throwing competition moved from Cattistock to Kingston Maurward House but was cancelled in 2018, the plan being to make it a biennial event from 2019. It was announced that the event would return to Cattistock in May 2022, however, in January 2022 it was announced that it had again been cancelled.

References

External links 
 Moores Biscuits
 Dorset knob throwing website

Biscuits
Knob